Julius Hemphill Big Band is an album by jazz saxophonist Julius Hemphill recorded in 1988 for the Elektra/Musician label.

Reception
The Allmusic review by Scott Yanow awarded the album 3 stars stating "The only recording by altoist Julius Hemphill at the head of a big band is a mostly very stimulating set of exploratory music... This valuable, but increasingly rare CD is particularly notable for giving one a rare chance to hear Hemphill's adventurous big-band arrangements".

Track listing
All compositions by Julius Hemphill except as indicated
 "At Harmony" - 9:03 
 "Leora" - 6:02 
 "C/Saw" - 8:29 
 "For Billie" - 8:32 
 "Drunk on God" (Hemphill, K. Curtis Lyle) - 18:53 
 "Bordertown" - 9:35 
Recorded at RCA Studio A in New York City in February 1988

Personnel
Julius Hemphill - alto saxophone, soprano saxophone
John Purcell, John Stubblefield, Marty Ehrlich - alto saxophone, soprano saxophone, flute
J. D. Parran - baritone saxophone, flute
David Hines, Rasul Siddik - trumpet
Vincent Chancey - french horn
Frank Lacy - trombone
David Taylor - bass trombone
Bill Frisell, Jack Wilkins - guitar 
Jerome Harris - electric bass
Ronnie Burrage - drums
Gordon Gottlieb - percussion
K. Curtis Lyle - speaker (track 5)
Darrold Hunt - conductor (track 5)

References 

Elektra Records albums
Julius Hemphill albums
1988 albums